Phymatocerini is a tribe of common sawflies in the family Tenthredinidae.

Genera
These genera belong to the tribe Phymatocerini:
 Ceratulus Macgillivray, 1908 g b
 Eutomostethus Enslin, 1914 g b
 Monophadnus Hartig, 1837 g b
 Niea Wei, 1998
 Paracharactus MacGillivray, 1908 g b
 Phymatocera Dahlbom, 1835 g b
 Rhadinoceraea Konow, 1886 g b
 Stethomostus Benson, 1939 g b
Data sources: i = ITIS, c = Catalogue of Life, g = GBIF, b = Bugguide.net

References

Further reading

External links

 

Tenthredinidae